Between Now and Forever is the second studio album by American country music artist Bryan White. It was released in 1996 (see 1996 in country music) on Asylum Records. Like his debut album Bryan White, it was certified platinum by the RIAA for U.S. sales of one million copies. The album produced four singles for White on the Billboard Hot Country Singles & Tracks (now Hot Country Songs) charts. In order of release, these were "I'm Not Supposed to Love You Anymore" (number 4), "So Much for Pretending" (number 1), "That's Another Song" (number 15), and "Sittin' on Go" (number 1). "Sittin' on Go" was also his last Number One hit.

Track listing

Personnel

 Bryan White – lead vocals, backIng vocals (1, 6, 8, 9, 10)
 Steve Nathan – acoustic piano (1, 3, 5, 7-10), keyboards (1, 3, 5, 7-10), organ (1, 3, 5, 7-10)
 John Hobbs – keyboards (2, 8, 10), organ (2, 8, 10)
 Randy McCormick – acoustic piano (2, 3, 4, 7-10)
 Hargus "Pig" Robbins – electric piano (6)
 Billy Joe Walker, Jr. – acoustic guitar, electric guitar 
 Paul Franklin – pedal steel guitar (1, 2, 5, 8, 9, 10)
 Brent Mason – electric guitar (1-5, 7-10)
 Stuart Duncan – mandolin (2, 4, 10), fiddle (2, 4, 10)
 Sonny Garrish – pedal steel guitar (3, 7), dobro (4)
 Derek George – acoustic guitar (6, 8, 9), backing vocals (6, 8, 9)
 Dan Dugmore – lap steel guitar (6, 9)
 Dann Huff – electric guitar (6, 9)
 Chris Leuzinger – electric guitar (6)
 Glenn Worf – bass guitar (1-5, 7-10)
 Mike Brignardello – bass guitar (6)
 Eddie Bayers – drums (1, 2, 5, 7-10), percussion (1, 2, 5, 7-10)
 Paul Leim – drums (3, 4, 6), percussion (3, 4, 6)
 John Wesley Ryles – backing vocals (1-5, 7, 10)
 Dennis Wilson – backing vocals (1-5, 7, 10)
 Curtis Young – backing vocals (1-5, 7, 10)

Chart performance

References
Allmusic (see infobox)

1996 albums
Asylum Records albums
Elektra Records albums
Bryan White albums
Albums produced by Kyle Lehning
Albums produced by Billy Joe Walker Jr.